Orphy  is a given name. Notable people with the name include:

 Orphy Klempa (1951–2021), American politician
 Orphy Robinson (born 1960), British jazz multi-instrumentalist